Harrison Fuller (August 1, 1845 – June 2, 1904) was an American farmer and politician from New York.

Life 
Fuller was born on August 1, 1845 in the family homestead in Adams, New York. His parents were William Fuller, a farmer, and Martha Keep. He attended the Union Academy in Belleville.

After he finished school, Fuller worked as a farmer. He eventually became one of the largest landowners in the county, cultivating more than 1,600 acres. He was active in the Watertown Produce Exchange and served as president and vice-president of the Jefferson County Agricultural Society. He was also interested in business and industrial ventures in and around Adams, serving as vice-president of Farmers' National Bank of Adams and a director of the Watertown National Bank. He lived in Adams Centre.

In 1891, Fuller was elected to the New York State Assembly as a Republican, representing the Jefferson County 1st District. He served in the Assembly in 1892, 1893, 1894, and 1895. While in the Assembly, he introduced several measures, including one that provided for the compulsory education of children in the state.

Fuller married Ella Snell in 1865. They had a daughter, Martha Annette. He was a freemason, a Royal Arch Mason, a Knight Templar, and a Shriner.

Fuller died in Watertown City Hospital on June 2, 1904, after suffering an accident where he was thrown from his buggy. He was buried in Honeyville Cemetery.

References

External links 

 The Political Graveyard
 Harrison Fuller at Find a Grave

1845 births
1904 deaths
People from Adams, New York
Farmers from New York (state)
Republican Party members of the New York State Assembly
19th-century American politicians
American Freemasons
Burials in New York (state)